Chesselden Ellis (1808 – May 10, 1854) was an American lawyer and politician who served one term as a United States representative from New York from 1843 to 1845.

Biography
Born in New Windsor, Vermont, he completed preparatory studies and was graduated from Union College in Schenectady in 1823. He studied law with John Cramer, was admitted to the bar in 1829 and commenced practice in Waterford, New York.

Early political career 
He was elected District Attorney of Saratoga County and served from April 25, 1837, until September 11, 1843.

Congress 
Ellis was elected as a Democrat to the 28th Congress, holding office from March 4, 1843, to March 4, 1845. He was an unsuccessful candidate for reelection in 1844 and resumed the practice of law in Waterford.

Later career and death 
He moved to New York City in 1845 and continued the practice of his profession until his death there on May 10, 1854.  Interment was in Waterford Rural Cemetery.

References

External links

1808 births
1854 deaths
Union College (New York) alumni
People from Windsor County, Vermont
People from Waterford, New York
New York (state) lawyers
County district attorneys in New York (state)
Burials in New York (state)
Democratic Party members of the United States House of Representatives from New York (state)
19th-century American politicians
19th-century American lawyers